Geotab Inc. is a privately held company that provides telematics hardware (In-Vehicle Monitoring Systems aka IVMS) which it presents as Internet of Things (IoT) devices. These devices feed their software as a service analytics platform. Headquartered in Oakville, Ontario it specializes in connecting commercial vehicles to the internet and providing web-based analytics for fleet management Geotab’s telematics allows businesses of all sizes to automate operations by integrating vehicle data and their other data assets. Geotab’s products are represented and sold worldwide through Authorized Geotab Resellers.

History

The company was founded in North America in 2000 by Neil Cawse, the current CEO.

 2000: CEO Neil Cawse established Geotab Canada in Oakville, Ontario.   
 2002: The GO2 fleet management device was introduced to the market.
 2010: Launched GO4 version 3 with more memory and accelerometer data, supported all protocols in one hardware, Geotab was officially named Garmin’s Fleet Management Partner, Geotab launched their fleet management software, MyGeotab.
 2011: The GO5 hardware plug-and-play device was launched.
 2012: Sprint signs as partner.
 2013: Geotab launched the first telematic NFC Driver ID Key Solution, Geotab launched their partnership with Navistar Inc. for Remote diagnostics, Geotab launched their partnership with PassTime.
 2014: Geotab announced GO7 new commercial telematics solution. Geotab announced their J1939 integration with the Mobileye 560 (Mobileye’s Advanced Driver Assistance System), Enterprise Fleet Management announces partnership with Geotab, Geotab and Telefonica announce a working partnership.
 2015: O2 (United Kingdom) signs as partner, Geotab launched their Marketplace, which complements their pre-existing MyGeotab platform. 
 2016: Geotab defeats two IP trolls: Rothschild Location Technologies and Orthosie.
 2017: T-Mobile partners to sell SyncUP FLEET, Registered "Geotab Cloud ELD" (Electronic Logging Device) that works on Android and iOS and connects the GO device with the app via cloud-based servers, The US Department of Homeland Security issues a blanket purchase agreement to Geotab.
 2018: Registers 1 million subscribers, Geotab launched the GO8 device, data.geotab.com and the MyGeotab app, AT&T signs as a partner.
 2019: Geotab launched the GO9 device, Geotab was awarded the world’s largest telematics contract by General Services Administration (GSA), Geotab locations expanded with new offices in China, Australia, Italy and France.  
 2020: Registers 2 million subscribers, Geotab launched its Public Works Solution in North America, Geotab achieved FedRAMP authorization for its cloud-based telematics platform, Geotab achieved ISO 27001 certification for its Information Security Management System, Geotab unveiled Geotab Keyless, one of the world’s first platform  that integrates a secured digital key function with a comprehensive and data-driven fleet management product. 
2021: Geotab launched their advanced electricity demand management, Geotab Energy, Geotab releases an upgraded GO9+ device, including Wi-Fi connectivity, Geotab surpassed 2,000 government customers, connecting over 250,000 government vehicles, Geotab expanded its business operations into Southeast Asia by opening an office in Singapore. 
2022: Geotab surpassed 3 million global subscribers.

Corporate Structure 
In 2009, Geotab USA, Inc. was incorporated in Delaware and is owned by Geotab Inc, headquartered in Oakville, Ontario. Geotab USA has offices in Las Vegas, NV. Another subsidiary, Geotab GmbH, has a presence in Germany, Spain, Italy, Australia, the UK and France. In 2015, Geotab acquired Strategic Telecom Solutions. In 2018, Geotab acquired time-of-use EV charging software FleetCarma. The following year, Geotab acquired BSM Technologies and Intendia.

Awards and recognition

Geotab has been included in Deloitte’s Technology Fast 500 list in North America, eight times in the last 10 years (2010-2014, 2017, 2018, 2019). Geotab has been included in Deloitte’s Technology Fast 50 in Canada four times (2010, 2012, 2013, 2014). In 2014 and 2017, Geotab was a recipient of Deloitte’s Technology Fast 50™ Leadership Award. In 2020, Geotab was named one of Canada’s Enterprise Fast 15 in Deloitte’s Technology Fast 50™ awards.

Geotab’s CEO, Neil Cawse, was named the EY Entrepreneur of the Year in 2015. Geotab was awarded Oakville’s Large Business of the Year in 2016. GreenFleet awarded Geotab for IT Innovation in fleet technology in 2017. In 2020, Geotab placed no. 210 on Globe and Mail’s Canada’s Top Growing Companies list.

In 2018, Geotab was recognized as Frost & Sullivan’s North American Company of the Year in the commercial fleet telematics industry. In 2018 and 2020, Geotab ranked on Canada’s Fastest-Growing Companies Growth 500. Geotab was also recognized as one of Canada’s Best Managed Companies for 2018, 2019, 2020 and 2021. In 2017, 2018, 2019 and 2020, Geotab became a certified Great Place to Work in Canada as well as a Great Place to Work in the USA in 2018, 2019 and 2020.

Geotab was presented Oakville’s 2019 Business Icon Award. Geotab was also ranked the number one Commercial Telematics vendor in the world in 2019 and 2020 by ABI Research.

References

Canadian companies established in 2000
Companies based in Ontario
Internet of things companies
Privately held companies of Canada
Telecommunications companies of Canada
Canadian brands
Technology companies established in 2000
Vehicle telematics